The Roselle Public Schools is a comprehensive community public school district that serves students in pre-kindergarten through twelfth grade from the borough of Roselle, in Union County, New Jersey, United States.

As of the 2020–21 school year, the district, comprised of eight schools, had an enrollment of 2,897 students and 289.0 classroom teachers (on an FTE basis), for a student–teacher ratio of 10.0:1.

The district is classified by the New Jersey Department of Education as being in District Factor Group "DE", the fifth-highest of eight groupings. District Factor Groups organize districts statewide to allow comparison by common socioeconomic characteristics of the local districts. From lowest socioeconomic status to highest, the categories are A, B, CD, DE, FG, GH, I and J.

Schools
Schools in the district (with 2020–21 enrollment data from the National Center for Education Statistics) are:

Preschools
Kindergarten Success Academy with 184 students in Kindergarten
Sheila Williams, Principal
Elementary schools
Harrison Elementary School with 268 students in grades 1-4
Dr. Melissa Nevarez, Principal
Dr. Charles C. Polk Elementary School with 295 students in grades 1-4
Andreea Harry, Principal
Washington Elementary School with 317 students in grades 1-4
Marianne Tankard, Principal
Middle schools
Leonard V. Moore Middle School with 460 students in grades 5-6
Craig Messemer, Principal
Grace Wilday Junior High School with 503 students in grades 7-8
Tomeeko Hunt, Principal
High school
Abraham Clark High School with 781 students in grades 9-12
Terry Shareef, Principal

Administration
Core members of the district's administration are:
Dr. Nathan L. Fisher, Superintendent
Anthony Juskiewicz, School Business Administrator/Board Secretary

Board of education
The district's board of education, with nine members, sets policy and oversees the fiscal and educational operation of the district through its administration. As a Type II school district, the board's trustees are elected directly by voters to serve three-year terms of office on a staggered basis, with three seats up for election each year held (since 2012) as part of the November general election. The board appoints a superintendent to oversee the district's day-to-day operations and a business administrator to supervise the business functions of the district.

References

External links
Roselle Public Schools
 
Data for the Roselle Public Schools, National Center for Education Statistics

New Jersey District Factor Group DE
Roselle, New Jersey
School districts in Union County, New Jersey